"Mother" Pollard (c. 1882–1885 – before 1963) was an American church elder who participated in the 1955–1956 Montgomery bus boycott. She has been called a civil rights hero for her tenacity in soothing the spirit of her pastor,  Martin Luther King Jr.

Pollard was an elder of the Dexter Avenue Baptist Church in Montgomery, Alabama, during the time of the bus boycott. It was a seminal event in the civil rights movement that produced a political and social protest campaign against the policy of racial segregation on the public transit system in Montgomery. King recounted in his writings that after several weeks of walking to her destinations rather than take the bus, he suggested to Mother Pollard, then about 72, that she might take the bus again for the sake of her health. She replied, "My feets is tired, but my soul is rested."

She was dubbed "Mother" because of her age; her real first name is unknown.

References

1880s births
Date of birth missing
Place of birth missing
Year of death missing
20th-century deaths
Place of death missing
American civil rights activists